Mehdi Embareck Zeffane (born 19 May 1992) is a professional footballer with Ligue 1 club Clermont. He plays primarily as a right-back, but has also been used as a left winger or left midfielder. Born in France, he represents Algeria at international level.

Club career
Born in Sainte-Foy-lès-Lyon, a commune in the Metropolis of Lyon, Zeffane made his debut for the Olympique Lyonnais B side on 21 August 2010 against RCO Agde at the Stade Louis Sanguin, in which he played the full 90 minutes, as Lyon's B team lost the match 1–0. He scored his first goal for the Lyon B team the next season on 13 August 2011 against FC Villefranche at the Stade Armand Chouffet, when he found the net in the 54th minute in what turned out to be Lyon B's last goal in a 6–0 rout over Villefranche.

In August 2015, Zeffane joined Ligue 1 club Rennes, signing a four-year contract with the club. On 22 August 2015, he scored the winning goal against his former side Lyon in a 2–1 away win for Rennes.

On 30 January 2020, Zeffane signed a two-year contract with Russian Premier League club Krylia Sovetov Samara.

On 14 January 2022, he joined Süper Lig club Yeni Malatyaspor on a one-and-a-half-year contract, with an option to extend for another year. He agreed the termination of his contract in April after the club failed to play his salary and that of teammates. He made nine appearances while Yeni Malatyaspor placed last in the league.

On 15 June 2022, Zeffane returned to France and signed a contract with Clermont for two years with an option for a third year.

International career
Born in France to Algerian parents, Zeffane was initially eligible to represent either France or Algeria.  In August 2014, he was named in a provisional 31-man squad by new Algeria coach Christian Gourcuff for a pair of 2015 Africa Cup of Nations qualifiers against Ethiopia and Mali. Ten days later, he was included in the final squad for the matches.

Career statistics

Club

International

Honours
Rennes
Coupe de France: 2018–19

Algeria
 Africa Cup of Nations: 2019

References

External links
 
 

Living people
1992 births
People from Sainte-Foy-lès-Lyon
French sportspeople of Algerian descent
Sportspeople from Lyon Metropolis
Algerian footballers
French footballers
Association football defenders
Algeria international footballers
Olympique Lyonnais players
Stade Rennais F.C. players
PFC Krylia Sovetov Samara players
Yeni Malatyaspor footballers
Clermont Foot players
Ligue 1 players
Russian Premier League players
Russian First League players
Süper Lig players
2015 Africa Cup of Nations players
2019 Africa Cup of Nations players
Algerian expatriate footballers
Expatriate footballers in Russia
Algerian expatriate sportspeople in Russia
Expatriate footballers in Turkey
Algerian expatriate sportspeople in Turkey
Footballers from Auvergne-Rhône-Alpes